Krakolye was a rural locality (a village) in Ust-Luzhsky Selsoviet of Kingiseppsky District in Leningrad Oblast, Russia, located just south of Ust-Luga and about  southwest of the Ust-Luga Harbour. It is now a part of the settlement of Ust-Luga. Population: 110 (2007 est.).

History
It was one of the two villages where the Votic language was still spoken; the other was Luzhitsy in the Leningrad Oblast. 

The village was merged into Ust-Luga effective October 24, 2008.

Notable people
Votic teacher and linguist Dmitri Tsvetkov (1890–1930) was born in Krakolye.

References

Geography of Leningrad Oblast
Kingiseppsky District